Khabarovsky District is an administrative and municipal district (raion), one of the seventeen in Khabarovsk Krai, Russia. It consists of two unconnected segments separated by the territory of Amursky District, which are located in the southwest of the krai. Its administrative center is the city of Khabarovsk (which is not administratively a part of the district). Population:

Administrative and municipal status
Within the framework of administrative divisions, Khabarovsky District is one of the seventeen in the krai. The city of Khabarovsk serves as its administrative center, despite being incorporated separately as a town of krai significance—an administrative unit with the status equal to that of the districts.

As a municipal division, the district is incorporated as Khabarovsky Municipal District. The city of krai significance of Khabarovsk is incorporated separately from the district as Khabarovsk Urban Okrug

References

Sources
 
 
 
 
 
 

Districts of Khabarovsk Krai
